Alfaisal University is a private, not-for-profit (teaching-oriented) coeducational institute of higher education located in Riyadh, Saudi Arabia.

It was founded in 2002 by the King Faisal Foundation. The first students were admitted in 2008. Alfaisal's total enrollment now exceeds 2500. The enrollment is 67% Saudi National with the remaining 33% being students from over 40 other nations. The total number of faculty is nearly 200 with international faculty from 31 countries.
The Board of Trustees includes representatives from five firms, four international firms, and a representative from the Ministry of Education.

Ranking

It is ranked 1805 internationally and 7 nationally on CWUR. It is ranked 5442 internationally and 23 nationally on Unirank.. They don't show up in the Academic Ranking of World Universities.

It is ranked between 551-600 on QS world university rankings 

Alfaisal University is ranked between 201-250 worldwide by Times Higher Education (THE) in its World University Rankings 2022, 601–800th in its Impact Rankings 2022,  36th worldwide in the "Young Universities" category, which looks at universities under 50 years old. 

It is also ranked 9th by the Times Higher Education in its category The world’s best small universities 2021 where Caltech is ranked 1st, and also ranked 20th by the Times Higher Education in its category Emerging Economies University Rankings 2020. A reference to the different ranks of this University in THE is made at   University Rankings Are Mostly Meaningless.

See also
List of universities in Saudi Arabia

References 

 
faisal university
Educational institutions established in 2002
Faisal
Faisal
2002 establishments in Saudi Arabia